Tonya Massaline (born December 30, 1977), née Tonya Washington, is an American former professional basketball player who was a forward in the Women's National Basketball Association (WNBA) for four seasons.

Washington accepted an athletic scholarship to attend the University of Florida in Gainesville, Florida, where she played for coach Carol Ross's Florida Gators women's basketball team from 1997 to 2000.  She did not play during her 1996–97 freshman season, but she excelled thereafter, receiving All-Southeastern Conference (SEC) honors in 1999 and 2000.  She graduated from the University of Florida with a bachelor's degree in 2000.

The Washington Mystics selected Washington in the second round, with the eighteenth overall pick, of the 2000 WNBA Draft.  She played for the Mystics for three and a half seasons from 2000 to 2003, and finished her fourth season with the Seattle Storm during the second half of 2003.  She played in 98 regular season games, mostly in reserve, during her WNBA pro career.

Early life
Tonya Massaline has an explosive first step creates her own shots can shoot off the dribble plays with a lot of enthusiasm on the court very versatile player who can play or the perimeter on in the paint a remarkable scoring talent sports one of the best vertical jump and broad jump on the team has a terrific one-on-one game and drives aggressively to the hole nicknamed "LT" by her teammates, taking the first and third letters of her given name: Latonya ough luck at USA Basketball tryouts: invited to tryout for the 1999 World University Games team, but underwent an emergency appendectomy days before the event began; earned a spot on the 1998 USA Jones Cup Team, but could not accept the position due to an academic conflict on target to graduate with an undergraduate degree in Recreation - Program Delivery in August 2000, when she would have had the option of retaining a fourth year of college eligibility after having sat out as a freshman due to NCAA rules (She was a partial qualifier her freshman season and was forced by the NCAA to sit out the year)., however, she decided to forego a fourth year of eligibility to pursue a professional basketball career.... on April 25, 2000 became the 18th overall selection in the 2000 WNBA draft, picked by Washington as the 2nd selection in the second round.

Florida statistics
Source

See also 
 List of Florida Gators in the WNBA
 List of University of Florida alumni

References 

1977 births
Living people
American women's basketball players
Basketball players from Florida
Florida Gators women's basketball players
Forwards (basketball)
People from Walton County, Florida
Seattle Storm players
Washington Mystics draft picks
Washington Mystics players